Foxfire: Confessions of a Girl Gang is a 2012 film based on the Joyce Carol Oates novel Foxfire: Confessions of a Girl Gang.

Plot
Set in the 1950s, a group of young girls in upstate New York form their own gang.

Cast
 Katie Coseni as Maddy
 Raven Adamson as Legs
 Claire Mazerolle as Goldie
 Rachael Nyhuus as Violet
 Paige Moyles as Lana
 Lindsay Rolland-Mills as VV
 Tamara Hope as Marianne 
 Ali Liebert as Muriel Orvis 
 Ian Matthews as Mr. Buttinger

Reception
, the film holds a 68% approval rating on review aggregator website Rotten Tomatoes, based on 19 reviews with an average rating of 6.26/10.

References

External links
 
 
 

2012 films
English-language Canadian films
English-language French films
2010s feminist films
Films based on American novels
Canadian drama films
French drama films
Films shot in Sault Ste. Marie, Ontario
Hood films
2010s gang films
2012 drama films
Films directed by Laurent Cantet
2010s English-language films
2010s Canadian films
2010s French films